The traditional Chinese calendar divides a year into 24 solar terms (节气/節氣). Shuāngjiàng, Sōkō, Sanggang, or Sương giáng is the 18th solar term. It begins when the Sun reaches the celestial longitude of 210° and ends when it reaches the longitude of 225°. It more often refers in particular to the day when the Sun is exactly at the celestial longitude of 210°. In the Gregorian calendar, it usually begins around October 23 and ends around November 7.

The western holiday of Halloween occurs in this solar term.

Pentads

豺乃祭獸, 'Dholes make offerings of the beasts'
草木黃落, 'The plants yellow and shed leaves'
蟄蟲咸俯, 'All insects go dormant'

Date and time

References

Autumn
18